Austrasiatica deforgesi is a species of sea snail, a cowry, a marine gastropod mollusc in the family Cypraeidae, the cowries.

Description

Distribution

References

 Lorenz F. (2002) New worldwide cowries. Descriptions of new taxa and revisions of selected groups of living Cypraeidae (Mollusca: Gastropoda). Schriften zur Malakozoologie aus dem Haus der Natur-Cismar 20: 1–292, pls 1–40. page(s): 66 [

External links

Cypraeidae
Gastropods described in 2002